The 1899 Rhode Island Rams football team represented the University of Rhode Island in the 1899 college football season. Led by second-year head coach Marshall Tyler, they finished the season with a record of 2–3–1.

Schedule

References

Rhode Island
Rhode Island Rams football seasons
Rhode Island Rams football